Radovan Biegl (born May 13, 1969) is a Czech former professional ice hockey goaltender.

Biegl played in the Czechoslovak First Ice Hockey League and the Czech Extraliga for HC Pardubice, ASD Dukla Jihlava, HC Zelézárny Třinec, HC Havířov, HC Vsetín and HC Zlin. He also played one season in the Tipsport Liga for HC Slovan Bratislava during the 1999–2000 season, where he won a league championship and was named into the league's All-Star team.

References

External links

1969 births
Living people
PSG Berani Zlín players
Czechoslovak ice hockey goaltenders
HC Dukla Jihlava players
HC Dynamo Pardubice players
HC Havířov players
LHK Jestřábi Prostějov players
HC Oceláři Třinec players
HC Slovan Bratislava players
Sportspeople from Hradec Králové
HC Tábor players
HC Vrchlabí players
VHK Vsetín players
Czech ice hockey goaltenders
Czech expatriate ice hockey players in Slovakia